Alan Nursall is a Canadian scientist and television personality, who reports on science news for the Canadian television series Daily Planet and the Alan Nursall Experience on the Discovery Channel. He is head of the Telus World of Science - Edmonton.

Biography 
Nursall was born December 26, 1957, in Edmonton, Alberta and raised in the city. His parents taught at the University of Alberta, where his father was a professor of zoology.

Nursall, who has an M.Sc. in geography and meteorology, joined Science North in Sudbury, Ontario at its launch in 1984. He has been involved in all aspects of program and exhibit development at the science centre, and was a popular media commentator for his ability to explain scientific topics. He became science director of the institution in 2000, and served until 2007.

In 2007, Nursall founded NEXT Exhibits and Creative Communication, Inc, which specialises in providing exhibitions for museums and science centres.

On January 1, 2014, Nursall started as the president and CEO of Telus World of Science - Edmonton.

Nursall's sister Catherine Mary Stewart is a film and television actress. His brother John Nursall is a freelance writer and has directed and produced multiple documentary projects.

References

External links 

 

Canadian television meteorologists
Canadian television reporters and correspondents
Academic staff of Laurentian University
Living people
Scientists from Edmonton
Canadian geographers
Science communicators
1957 births
20th-century Canadian scientists
21st-century Canadian scientists